George Collinson Weightman-Smith (31 October 1905 – April 1972) was a South African athlete who competed at the 1928 Summer Olympics. He finished 21st in the javelin throw and fifth in the 110 m hurdles, behind the teammate Sid Atkinson who won gold; he failed to complete his decathlon program.

References

1905 births
1972 deaths
Athletes (track and field) at the 1928 Summer Olympics
Olympic athletes of South Africa
South African decathletes
South African male hurdlers
South African male javelin throwers
Sportspeople from Durban
Colony of Natal people
Alumni of Hilton College (South Africa)